Xylocopa violacea, the violet carpenter bee, is the common European species of carpenter bee, and one of the largest bees in Europe. It is also native to Asia.

Like most members of the genus Xylocopa, it makes its nests in dead wood. It is not particularly aggressive, and will attack only if forced to.

Distribution
The range of Xylocopa violacea extends from Europe eastward across Asia as far as central China, restricted to latitudes above 30 degrees. Most sightings refer to any of several other common black Xylocopa, such as X. nasalis, X. tenuiscapa, or X. tranquebarorum.

In 2006, Xylocopa violacea was reported from Cardigan, Wales. In 2007, it was found breeding for the first time in England, in Leicestershire. This follows a northwards expansion of its range in France, Germany, and the Channel Islands. In 2010 it was recorded in Northamptonshire and Worcestershire.

Description
Violet carpenter bees hibernate overwinter and they emerge in the spring, usually around April or May. Hibernation is undertaken by the adults in wood where there are abandoned nest tunnels. In the late spring or early summer, they may be seen around searching for mates and suitable nesting sites. After mating, the gravid females bore tunnels in dead wood, which is where the name "carpenter bee" comes from, although old nest tunnels may be used.

Like other solitary bees, the female creates the nest alone. The eggs are laid within a series of small cells, each of which is supplied with a pollen ball for the larvae to feed upon. The adults emerge in late summer then hibernate until the following year.

Gallery

References

violacea
Hymenoptera of Asia
Hymenoptera of Europe
Insects of the Middle East
Insects of Central Asia
Insects of Western Asia
Fauna of the Iberian Peninsula
Insects of Afghanistan
Insects of China
Insects of Iran
Insects of Mongolia
Insects of Pakistan
Insects of Russia
Insects of Turkey
Fauna of the British Isles
Fauna of England
Insects described in 1758
Taxa named by Carl Linnaeus